The Coastal and Estuarine Research Federation (CERF) is a private, nonprofit organization that was created in 1971. At that time, the members of two regionally based organizations, the Atlantic Estuarine Research Society (AERS) and the New England Estuarine Research Society (NEERS) recognized the need for a third estuarine organization that would address national (now worldwide) estuarine and coastal issues. Today, CERF is a multidisciplinary federation of members and seven regionally based affiliate societies dedicated to the understanding and wise stewardship of estuaries and coasts worldwide.

Mission
CERF advances understanding and wise stewardship of estuarine and coastal ecosystems worldwide. Its mission is to: 

Promote research in estuarine and coastal ecosystems
Support education of scientists, decision-makers and the public
Facilitate communication among these groups
 
Membership in CERF is open to all who support these goals. The Federation currently has approximately 1,650 members, and approximately 1,000 more who are members of the Affiliate Societies.

CERF addresses the purposes listed above by convening conferences in odd-numbered years (see Meetings), through the more frequent meetings of its Affiliate Societies in their regions and through regular publication of the scholarly journal Estuaries and Coasts and the Newsletter. In addition, the Federation serves as a source of advice on estuarine and coastal matters by responding to requests for information from legislative and management organizations.

History 

In the mid 1960s estuarine scientists around the globe were beginning to recognize that wide dissemination of information concerning estuarine water circulation patterns, rates of exchange of materials within coastal and marine waters and the ecology of estuarine organisms was essential to the realistic management of estuaries in the future. This wide recognition of the intertwined interest between knowledge of estuarine systems and eutrophication characterizes the task oriented nature of the study of estuaries.

In the Fall of 1969, a special committee was assembled to explore the formation of a new society not dedicated to any particular geographic region in order to accommodate a larger domestic and international membership. The new group known as the Estuarine Research Federation (ERF) was created.

In an effort to identify the true scope of ERF interests to ALL people who may be interested in participating in the Federation's activities, ERF members voted by mail, in the summer of 2007, to approve a name change to Coastal and Estuarine Research Federation (CERF).

Meetings 

CERF (formerly ERF) has hosted 26 international conferences during the  years since the Federation's inception:

Leadership 
CERF has endured and evolved during its short history under the leadership of the individuals listed below. Those who have led the society are important members of the estuarine and coastal science communities. The list provide below includes the name of each president and the most significant scientific contribution made by each individual prior to their Presidencies.

L. Eugene Cronin, 1971–1973
"Anatomy and histology of the male reproductive system of Callinectes sapidus rathbun." Journal of Morphology 1947
H. Perry Jeffries, 1973–1975 
"Stress syndrome in hard clam Mercenaria mercenaria." Journal of Invertebrate Pathology 1972
F. John Vernberg, 1975–1977
"Studies on the physiological variation between tropical and temperate zone fiddler crabs of the genus UCA.2. Oxygen Consumption of whole organisms." Biological Bulletin 1959
Michael Castagna 1977-1979 
"Culture of bay scallop, Argopecten irradians, in Virginia." Marine Fisheries Review 1975
Robert J. Reimold, 1979–1981
"Movement of phosphorus through salt marsh cord grass, Spartina alterniflora loisel." Limnology and Oceanography 1972
Barbara L. Welsh, 1981–1983
"Role of grass shrimp, Palaemonetes pugio, in a tidal marsh ecosystem." Ecology 1975
Austin Beatty Williams, 1983–1985
"Swimming crabs of the genus Callinectes (decapoda portunidae)." Fishery Bulletin 1974
Jerry R. Schubel, 1985–1987
"Turbidity maximum of northern Chesapeake Bay" Science 1968
Donald F. Boesch, 1987–1989
"Classification and community structure of macrobenthos in Hampton Roads area, Virginia." Marine Biology 1973
Robert J. Orth, 1989–1991 
"Chesapeake Bay- An unprecedented decline in submerged aquatic vegetation." Science 1983
Christopher F. D’Elia, 1991–1993
"Determination of total nitrogen in aqueous samples using persulfate digestion." Limnology and Oceanography 1977
Frederic H. Nichols, 1993–1995
"The modification of an estuary." Science 1986
Candace A. Oviatt, 1995–1997
"Patterns of productivity during eutrophication – A mesocosm experiment." Marine Ecology Progress Series 1986
Nancy N. Rabalais, 1997–1999
"Comparison of continuous records of near-bottom dissolved oxygen from the hypoxia zone along the Louisiana Coast." Estuaries 1994
Anne E. Giblin, 1999–2001
"Biogeochemical diversity along a riverside toposequence in Arctic Alaska." Ecological Monographs. 1991
Dennis M. Allen, 2001–2003
"Interannual variation in larval fish recruitment to estuarine epibenthic habitats." Marine Ecology Progress Series 1990
Linda C. Schaffner, 2003–2005 
"Small-scale organism distributions and patterns of species diversity – Evidence for positive interactions in an estuarine benthic community." Marine Ecology Progress Series 1990
Robert R. Christian, 2005–2007 
"Multiyear distribution patterns of nutrients within the Neuse River estuary, North Carolina." Marine Ecology Progress Series 1991
Robert W. Howarth, 2007–2009 
"Nutrient limitation of net primary production in marine ecosystems." Annual Review of Ecology and Systematics 1998
Susan L. Williams, 2009–2011
"Experimental studies of Caribbean seagrass bed development." Ecological Monographs 1990
Walter R. Boynton 2011-2013
"Inputs, transformations and transport of nitrogen and phosphorus in Chesapeake Bay and selected tributaries." Estuaries 1995
Kenneth L. Heck Jr. 2013-2015
"Explicit calculation of the rarefaction diversity measurement and the determination of sufficient sample size." Ecology 1975
Robert R. Twilley, 2015-2017 
"The exchange of organic carbon in basin mangrove forests in a southwest Florida estuary." Estuarine, Coastal and Shelf Science 1985
Hilary A. Neckles, 2017-2019
"Relative effects of nutrient enrichment and grazing on epiphyte-macrophyte (Zostera marina L.) dynamics." Oecologia 1993
James W. Fourqurean, 2019-2021
"Seagrass ecosystems as a globally significant carbon stock."  Nature Geoscience 2012
Leila Hamdan, 2021-2023
"Effects of COREXIT® EC9500A on bacteria from a beach oiled by the Deepwater Horizon spill." Aquatic Microbial Ecology 2011
Linda Blum, 2023-2025
"Spartina alterniflora root dynamics in a Virginia marsh." Marine Ecology Progress Series 1993

Publications 

CERF publishes the journal Estuaries and Coasts. Prior to 2006 Estuaries and Coasts was known as Estuaries. Prior to the formation of CERF, the journal Estuaries was known as Chesapeake Science (1960–1978).

Affiliate societies 
 Atlantic Estuarine Research Society (AERS)
Southeastern Estuarine Research Society (SEERS)
Atlantic Canada Coastal Estuarine Science Society (ACCESS)
California Estuarine Research Society (CAERS)
Gulf Estuarine Research Society (GERS)
New England Estuarine Research Society (NEERS)
Pacific Estuarine Research Society (PERS)

See also
 Chesapeake Bay
 Long Island Sound
 The National Estuarine Research Reserve System

References 

CERF entry in The AIBS Member Society and Organization Directory

Environmental organizations based in the United States
Coasts of the United States
Estuaries of the United States
Water organizations in the United States
Environmental organizations established in 1971
1971 establishments in the United States